Valdivel Jayalakshmi (born 5 August 1971) is an Indian sprinter. She represented India in 4 x 100 metres relay together with P. T. Usha, Rachita Mistry, and E.B. Shyla at the 1998 Asian Championships in Athletics, where her team won the gold medal on the way to setting the current national record of 44.43 s.

She also competed in the women's 4 × 100 metres relay at the 2000 Summer Olympics.

References

External links
 

1971 births
Living people
Athletes (track and field) at the 2000 Summer Olympics
Indian female sprinters
Olympic athletes of India
Place of birth missing (living people)
Athletes (track and field) at the 1998 Asian Games
Athletes (track and field) at the 2002 Asian Games
Asian Games competitors for India
Olympic female sprinters
20th-century Indian women
21st-century Indian women